Turbo Sub is a first-person shoot 'em up released in arcades by Entertainment Sciences in 1985. Aliens have attacked the planet and the player fights them beneath the ocean using a submersible ship. Six years after the arcade original, Atari Corporation published a Lynx version, which adds a two-player mode.

Gameplay

Development
Entertainment Sciences created Bouncer and then Turbo Sub before folding. 
According to a promotional flyer, Turbo Sub contains over 400 images.

Release
A version for the Lynx was developed by NuFX and published by Atari Corporation in 1991. The manual clarifies the alien conflict as taking place on Earth in the 28th century.

Reception
In 1986, Computer & Video Games magazine called Turbo Sub, "One of the most bizarre trips you're likely to make". The reviewer praised how the experience is automatically adjusted based on the player's skill, so the game plays differently over time.

In a contemporaneous review for the Lynx version, Robert A. Jung concluded, "What Turbo Sub lacks in originality and variety, it makes up with blistering excitement. If you've got an appetite for simple, uncomplicated massive destruction at Mach 3, Turbo Sub is the way to go." He gave a score of 7.5 out of 10. In the "Atari Attack" column in the final issue of Raze magazine, Turbo Sub received a score of 73%.

Notes

References

External links 
 Turbo Sub at AtariAge
 Turbo Sub at GameFAQs
 Turbo Sub at Killer List of Videogames
 Turbo Sub at MobyGames

1985 video games
Arcade video games
Atari games
Atari Lynx games
NuFX games
Science fiction video games
Shooter video games
Single-player video games
Video games developed in the United States
Video games set in the future